Joshi is a surname used by the Brahmin (caste) in India and Nepal. Joshi is also sometimes spelled as Jyoshi. The name is derived from the Sanskrit word Jyotishi meaning "astrologer" or a person who practices jyotisha. Jyotisha refers to Hindu astrology and astronomy and is derived from jyotish ("light bringer or reflect light like sun").

Joshi is a common family name in Delhi, Gujarat, Karnataka, Madhya Pradesh, Maharashtra, Odisha, Haryana, Punjab, Rajasthan, Uttarakhand, Goa and Uttar Pradesh in India and Nepal. In Kathmandu valley, the surname Joshi is used by Newar Srēṣṭhas.

Notable individuals

Politicians, civil servants and military

 Alok Joshi, Indian police officer and intelligence agency chief
 A. C. Joshi (1908–1971), Indian botanist and Civil Service officer
 Banwari Lal Joshi (1936–2017), Indian civil servant and state governor
 Bhanu Bhakta Joshi, Nepalese politician
 Bhojraj Joshi, Nepalese politician
 General B.C. Joshi (1935–1994), Chief of the Indian Army
 C. P. Joshi, Indian politician (Indian National Congress), former Union Minister for Road Transport and Highways, Govt. of India
 Devendra Kumar Joshi, Chief of Naval Staff of the Indian Navy
 Govinda Raj Joshi, Nepalese politician (Nepali Congress) and former Minister
 Hari Dev Joshi, 11th, 16th and 18th Chief Minister Of Rajasthan
 Hora Prasad Joshi, Nepalese politician
 Manohar Joshi, 12th Chief Minister of Maharashtra
 Murli Manohar Joshi, Indian politician (Bharatiya Janta Party), chairman, Public Accounts Committee of the parliament
 Nabindra Raj Joshi, Nepali politician
 Pralhad Joshi, Indian politician (BJP)
 Puran Chand Joshi, Indian communist leader
 Rita Bahuguna Joshi, Indian politician (BJP)
 Sharad Anantrao Joshi, Indian agricultural activist and politician (Shetkari Sanghatana)
 Lieutenant General Yogesh Kumar Joshi, Indian army, Chief of staff of Northern army command

Writers, educators and scholars

 Anandi Gopal Joshi (1865–1887), first Indian woman to be awarded a western medicine degree
 Angur Baba Joshi (1932–2020), Nepalese scholar, first female School Principal of Nepal
 Anupam Joshi, American cybersecurity expert and Professor and Chair of Computer Science and Electrical Engineering at the University of Maryland
 Aravind Joshi, Professor of Computer and Cognitive Science at the University of Pennsylvania
 Arun Joshi, Indian novelist
 Chintaman Vinayak Joshi, Marathi humorist, author of "Chimanrao" series of books
 Girija Prasad Joshi, Nepalese Newari language writer
 Indra Joshi, British physician
 Lakshman Shastri Joshi, Indian scholar of Sanskrit, Hindu Dharma, and a Marathi literary critic
 Mahadevshastri Joshi, Marathi writer
 Mangal Raj Joshi, Nepalese royal astrologer
 Manohar Shyam Joshi, post-modern Hindi writer and Father of Indian soap operas
 Prasoon Joshi, Hindi lyricist
 Prem Lal Joshi, Indian research scholar of Accounting and writer
 Ramlal Joshi, Nepalese author and writer 
 Ruchir Joshi, author and filmmaker
 S. T. Joshi, Indian-American editor, critic, and scholar
 Satya Mohan Joshi (1920–2022), Nepalese author and writer, first recipient of Madan Puraskar
 Sharad Joshi, Hindi writer and satirist, Padma Shri awardee
 Shekhar Joshi, Hindi author
 Shukraraj Shastri (born Shukra Raj Joshi), Nepalese author, social reformer and political martyr
 Suresh Joshi, Gujarati poet, writer and literary critic
 Sushma Joshi, Nepalese writer and filmmaker
 Umashankar Joshi, Gujarati poet

Artists and performers

 Aashirman DS Joshi, Nepalese actor
 Anshuman Joshi, Marathi actor
 Ayushman Joshi, Nepalese actor
 Bhimsen Joshi, Bharat Ratna, vocalist of Hindustani classical music
 Chetan Joshi, flautist
 Damayanti Joshi, Kathak dancer and guru
 Dev Joshi, Indian television actor.
 Dilip Joshi (born 1969), Hindi and Gujarati actor
 Gajananrao Joshi, violinist and vocalist Hindustani classical music
 Gayatri Joshi, Indian Actress
 Gulki Joshi (born 1980), Indian television actress 
 Indira Joshi, Nepali singer and model
 Malina Joshi, Nepali beauty pageant and model
 Manoj Joshi (born 1945), Gujarati, Marathi and Hindi Actor
 Manasi Joshi Roy (born 1968), Indian television actress
 Nivedita Joshi, Marathi actress
 Pallavi Joshi (born 1969), Indian Actress, winner of National award for the film Woh Chokri
 Poonam Joshi (born 23 October 1970), Indian television actress 
 Prasoon Joshi (born September 1971), Indian lyricist
 Purbi Joshi (born 1974), Indian actress
 Rohan Joshi Indian Stand-up comedian, performer
 Santosh Joshi, vocalist of Hindustani classical music
 Sharman Joshi (born 1979), Bollywood actor
 Shikha Joshi (1976-2015), Indian actress who committed suicide
 Shivangi Joshi (born 1995), Indian television actress
 Spruha Joshi, Marathi actress
 Swwapnil Joshi (born 1977), Marathi actor
 Tulip Joshi, Indian Actress, model
 V Joshi, (AKA Joshiy) Indian director known for his Malayalam films
 Vinayak Joshi, Kannada actor

Sports

 Aniruddha Joshi, Indian cricketer
Harshvardhan Joshi, Indian mountaineer
 Naresh Joshi, Nepalese football 
 Sunil Joshi, cricketer who played for India national cricket team as a left arm spinner in one day internationals and test match cricket
 Sunil Lal Joshi, Nepali Olympic weightlifter
 Uday Joshi, Indian cricketer who played for Sussex

Social service

 Narayan Malhar Joshi, Indian trade union leader and founder of the Social service league
 Sister Nirmala Joshi, Nepalese Catholic sister, former head at Missionaries of Charity

References 

Indian surnames
Marathi-language surnames
Gujarati-language surnames
Surnames of Nepalese origin
Khas surnames